The Finno-Ugric countries are the three independent nation states with a national majority that speaks a Finno-Ugric language: Finland and Estonia, which are inhabited by Baltic Finnic peoples, and Hungary, which is majority Magyar.
The three countries are represented in the Finno-Ugric Congress.
They work together in funding research on Finno-Ugric topics and in protecting the minority rights of other Finno-Ugric-speaking nations that do not occupy sovereign states; collectively these have been called Fenno-Ugria.

Modern entities

Independent sovereign states

Balto-Finnic

Ugric

Countries where Finno-Ugric languages have official or co-official status

Saami

Ugric

Permic

Volgaic

Provinces and autonomous regions without official or co-official status

Historical states and dynasties

Hungarian states

Note: some of these countries, while not predominantly ethnically Hungarian, were ruled by Hungarians, so they are considered as such here.

Post-World War I states

Autonomous regions

See also
World Congress of Finno-Ugric Peoples

References

Countries
Country classifications
Eastern Europe
Northern Europe